Drest son of Talorcan (Scottish Gaelic: Drest mac Talorgan), was king of the Picts from 782 until 783, succeeding his father Talorgan.

See also
 House of Óengus

External links
The Pictish Chronicle

783 deaths
Pictish monarchs
8th-century Scottish monarchs
Year of birth unknown